Born Thomas Burke Bishop, Jr., Junior Burke is an American fiction writer, songwriter and educator.

Fiction

Burke's novel, Something Gorgeous was published in 2005. This work of speculative fiction explored the background of the era that spawned The Great Gatsby and was lauded for its invention by the UK's Historical Novel Society.  In 2012, in a slightly revised version, it became available as an e/book.  In 2005, Burke founded the online literary journal, "not enough night" and served as Executive Editor until he and fellow editor Maureen Owen chose to discontinue publication in 2014.  "A Thousand Eyes", an eco-horror novel, was published in 2018 in the UK and US by Cosmic Egg Books, an imprint of John Hunt Ltd. In 2020, "The Cold Last Swim", was published by Gibson House Press, one of five finalists for a Sidewise Award, the annual prize for works of Alternate History. Burke's short story "The Evan Price Signature Model" is included in the May 2021 anthology "Collectibles" edited by Lawrence Block, published by Subterranean Press. His satirical novel, “Buddha Was a Cowboy", which received a Starred advance review from Booklist, was published by Gibson House Press in the US in September 2022 and in the UK and Ireland a month later. It is a finalist for the Chanticleer International Mark Twain Book Award in the Satire and Humor category and nominated for a Reading the West Award from the Independent Booksellers Association in the category of Adult Fiction. Burke spent the entire fall of 2022 in Ireland, Spain and Portugal, gathering material for his next work of fiction.

Songwriter

His songs have been performed and recorded by a wide range of artists and have earned a Cable Ace Award and an RIAA Gold Record. "Spot of Time", a collection of Burke performing original, poetically based songs, was released in February 2018, produced by Max Davies. In 2021, Bongo Boy Records released his single "Any Eyes but Mine" as well as the seven-song Americana ep "Nothin' But" produced by the creative team of Billy Panda and Grace McKay. While Burke writes his songs on archtop and classical guitar, he provides lyrics for composers, keyboardists in particular, in several genres, and often accompanies performing and recording artists on harmonica and dulcimer.

Educator

In 2002, for Naropa University, Burke designed and implemented a highly successful low residency MFA degree in Creative Writing. After three years of directing that program, he was tapped to be Chair of Naropa's Jack Kerouac School of Disembodied Poetics, founded by poets Allen Ginsberg and Anne Waldman, serving from January 2006 to June 2010. In May 2008, Burke was the recipient of Naropa's President's Award for "extraordinary dedication and service" throughout that academic year. He remained at Naropa until 2020, at which time he informed the university he would no longer be serving on its faculty, deciding to focus exclusively on creative writing.

References

External links
Burke's Official faculty page at Naropa

Living people
Naropa University faculty
Writers from Boulder, Colorado
American male composers
21st-century American composers
Songwriters from Colorado
Year of birth missing (living people)
Songwriters from Illinois
21st-century American male musicians
American male songwriters